Amar sadh na mitilo is a Shyama Sangeet or more specifically a Kali Bhajan composed by Kamalakanta Bhattacharya. In this song the poet indicates the futility of desire and explains the hardships he had gone through in order to get rid of the same. Also we see him dissatisfied by the lovelessness of the society and thus wants to escape this world and praying to Goddess Kali to give him shelter. Pannalal Bhattacharya was famous for singing this song.

Lyrics

Ma ...
Amar sadh na mitilo,
Asha na purilo
Shakali phuraye jay Ma (x2)
Janamer sadh daki go Ma tore,
Kole tule nite aay Ma
Shakali phuraye jay Ma.
Amar sadh na mitilo,
Asha na purilo
Shakali phuraye jay Ma.
Prithibir keu bhalo to bashena
Ei prithibi bhalo basite janena (x2)
Jetha ache shuddhu bhalo basha bashi(*2)

Setha jete pran chay Ma
Shakali phuraye jay Ma.
Amar sadh na mitilo,
Asha na purilo
Shakali phuraye jay Ma.
Bodo daga peye, bashona tejechi
Bodo jwala shaye kamona bhulechi (x2)
Anek kendechi, kandite parina(*2),
Buk phete bhenge jaye Ma
Shakali phuraye jay Ma.
Amar sadh na mitilo,
Asha na purilo,
Shakali phuraye jay Ma.
Janamer sadh daki go ma tore,
Kole tule nite aye Ma
Shakali phuraye jay Ma.
Amar sadh na mitilo,
Asha na purilo
Shakali phuraye jay Ma.

References

See also
Kamalakanta Bhattacharya

Bengali-language songs
Hindu music
Shyama Sangeet
Hindu devotional songs